Vulcain is a Swiss luxury watchmaker based in La Chaux-de-Fonds, Switzerland. It was founded in 1858 by Maurice Ditisheim as Manufacture Ditisheim' in La Chaux-de-Fonds, being rebranded as Vulcain in 1894. In 1947, Vulcain developed the first alarm watch, the Vulcain Cricket.

Foundation 

Vulcain was founded in 1858 in La Chaux-de-Fonds, Switzerland by the Ditisheim brothers Maurice, Gaspard and Aron. The Ditisheims were one of many Jewish families involved in innovation and modernisation of the watch industry. Within 20 to 30 years, the company grew from a small studio to a successful and well-known brand. Since the brothers were also involved with foreign branches in the industry, they had the advantage of an international network of contacts. In 1886, Maurice bought the company from his brothers. He was awarded a bronze medal at the Universal Exhibition in Paris 1889 for his self-winding watch "La vallée de l'Arve."

Through to the end of the century, the watchmaker was called "Manufacture Ditisheim". In 1894, watches were first offered under the branding of Vulcain, with the company now under the leadership of Maurice Ditisheim's son, Ernest-Albert Ditisheim. In 1900, Ditisheim registered the name 'Vulcain' as a brand name for his pocket watches, naming it after the Roman god of Fire.

Up until World War II, Vulcain solely focused on the production of pocket watches, only turning to wristwatches with the uptake in popularity of wristwatches for the military.

The Alarm Watch 
In the early 1940s, Vulcain invented the idea of a mechanical alarm watch. There had been two prior attempts by other watchmakers in the early 19th century, but these projects were failures.

In 1942, Vulcain had begun production of a prototype alarm movement, later named the 120. The Caliber 120 could sound for above 20 seconds when fully wound through the invention of the 'dual barrel'. This system ensured two separate barrels, which contain the wound up springs generating energy for the watch. These barrels separately provided energy for the movement, and for the alarm; hence ensuring that the watch could sound for significantly longer than prior iterations.

The development of the volume, developed alongside French physicist Paul Langevin took a further 5 years, when Vulcain patented a double-case design to reverberate the sound further. The sound of the alarm notably sounded similar to that of a cricket, with the insect serving as its namesake.

The Cricket, released in 1947, ran off of the final iteration of the Caliber 120, which was 17 -Jewels, had a near two-day power reserved and beat at 18,000 Beats per hour.

Presidential tradition 
Vulcain gained brand recognition from the early 1950s for their invention of the alarm watch – the Vulcain Cricket, which was presented at a Swiss Watch Fair in 1947.

In 1953, the White House Press Photographer's Association presented Harry S. Truman with a 14k gold version of the watch on the eve of his leaving presidential office. Following from this, nearly every President has been gifted one to commemorate their leaving office.

The Cricket also served as an adventurers watch, as the brand in Le Locle had partnered with multiple mountaineering and maritime expeditions.

The Extended Watch Range 
Vulcain, introduced the Cricket Nautical in 1961. The watch alarm was marketed as being audible underwater.

Quartz crisis 

1961 the companies Revue, Vulcain, Buser and Phénix merged to form the Manufactures d'Horlogerie Suisse Réunis SA (MSR).

During the so-called quartz crisis in the 1980s, Vulcain struggled as the market for high-quality luxury mechanical wristwatches collapsed. The future was seen to belong to cheap quartz watches. Vulcain still produced their watches for sister brands within the MSR, but had a temporary break in manufacture. When the Cricket was produced again under the name of "Revue Thommen", this was done in La Chaux-de-Fonds.

Restart of the brand Vulcain under the PMH (Production et Marketing Horologer) 

Towards the end of the 1990s, Vulcain was sold by MSR. After its bankruptcy at the end of the 1990s, the Production et marketing Horologer (PMH) acquired all rights to the brand and the Vulcain Cricket V10 was introduced in 2001.

This new beginning was associated with the relocation from La Chaux-de-Fonds to Le Locle, known for its association with the watch industry.

In 2002, the first new models of the Vulcain were presented, largely based on historical models.

References

External links 

 Vulcain (company website)

Watch brands
Le Locle
La Chaux-de-Fonds